The M940 MPT-SD (multi-purpose tracer, self-destruct) shell is a 20×102mm round produced by General Dynamics primarily for an anti-aircraft role. The round includes a red tracer to aid in targeting. The round includes a high explosive and incendiary component and can also defeat light armor (hence its multi-purpose designation). The self-destruct feature engages at approx.  and destroys the round, preventing it from falling back to earth and inflicting damage to the surrounding territory. The price per round in 2008 was approximately $27.

See also 
Centurion C-RAM

References

Artillery shells
Large-caliber cartridges